Melvin is a village in Ford County, Illinois, United States. The population was 452 at the 2010 census.

Geography
Melvin is located at  (40.569480, -88.248880).

Demographics

As of the census of 2000, there were 465 people, 192 households, and 132 families residing in the village. The racial makeup of the village was 99.57% White, 0.22% Native American, and 0.22% from two or more races. Hispanic or Latino of any race were 1.72% of the population.

There were 192 households, out of which 32.3% had children under the age of 18 living with them, 51.6% were married couples living together, 10.9% had a female householder with no husband present, and 31.3% were non-families. 29.2% of all households were made up of individuals, and 17.2% had someone living alone who was 65 years of age or older.  The average household size was 2.42 and the average family size was 2.93.

In the village, the population was spread out, with 27.3% under the age of 18, 6.0% from 18 to 24, 25.6% from 25 to 44, 20.4% from 45 to 64, and 20.6% who were 65 years of age or older.  The median age was 38 years. For every 100 females, there were 92.9 males.  For every 100 females age 18 and over, there were 88.8 males.

The median income for a household in the village was $37,500, and the median income for a family was $47,500. Males had a median income of $31,938 versus $21,250 for females. The per capita income for the village was $16,383.  About 4.8% of families and 7.0% of the population were below the poverty line, including 3.8% of those under age 18 and 16.1% of those age 65 or over.

Notable people

 Leslie Cornelius Arends, U.S. congressman
 Horatio N. Boshell, physician and Illinois state representative
 Josephine Perry, Illinois state representative
Lorinda Perry, economist, professor, lawyer

References

Villages in Ford County, Illinois
Villages in Illinois